is a Japanese anime television series that is a part of the Transformers robot superhero franchise. It aired from July 3, 1987 to March 25, 1988, and its 17:00–17:30 timeslot was used to broadcast Mashin Hero Wataru at the end of its broadcast. It serves as the first sequel series to the Japanese dub of the original 1985 The Transformers cartoon series in the Generation 1 franchise, followed by Transformers: Super-God Masterforce.

Development
Initially, Takara, the Japanese producers of the Transformers toyline, imported the American Transformers cartoon series from 1985 to 1986. When the series came to an end with the three-part miniseries "The Rebirth" in 1987, however, Takara decided to continue the series themselves, declining to import The Rebirth and instead creating a full-length 35-episode spin-off series, Transformers: The Headmasters (two additional clips episodes were produced after the fact for direct-to-video release). Supplanting The Rebirth'''s position in Japanese continuity, The Headmasters occurred one year after The Return of Optimus Prime, introducing the title characters to the Transformers universe in a different way. Whereas in western fiction, the Headmasters result from the merging of a Transformer with an organic alien being from the planet Nebulos, the Headmasters of the Japanese series are a group of small Cybertronians who departed the planet millions of years ago and crash-landed on the inhospitable planet Master. To survive its harsh climate, a select few Cybertronians constructed larger bodies called "Transtectors", to which they connected as the heads.

Story
Six years after the decisive battle against Unicron, a group of rebellious Headmasters led by Weirdwolf join with Galvatron's Decepticons in an attack on Cybertron. The Headmasters, led by Cerebros, return to their home planet to aid in its defense. The situation soon gets worse when it is revealed that Vector Sigma, the super-computer at the planet's heart, is destabilizing, and Optimus Prime again sacrifices his life to save Cybertron. This proves to be only delaying the inevitable, however, as a bomb attack instigated by Scorponok turns Cybertron into a burnt-out, inhospitable husk. Rodimus Prime departs to search for a new planet for the Transformers to live on, leaving Cerebros in command, operating from the planet Athenia. Meanwhile, Scorponok replaces Galvatron- who had vanished in the explosion- as Decepticon leader, constructing a personal Transtector and redubbing himself MegaZarak to battle Cerebros' own giant form, Fortress Maximus.

Although populated mainly with new characters, The Headmasters featured characters from all previous seasons, including new versions of Soundwave and Blaster, rebuilt after a duel destroyed them both as Soundblaster and Twincast. Human Daniel Witwicky and his young Autobot friend Wheelie also played major roles in the series, serving as the youthful characters for the audience to identify with. More new characters were introduced when Galvatron returned to leadership and the Decepticons embarked on a space voyage, ransacking planets in a chain of stories that introduced the Horrorcons, Autobot and Decepticon clones. Later, the Decepticon ninja six-changer Sixshot kills Ultra Magnus, and the Autobot Headmasters manage to destroy Galvatron, leaving Scorponok to become leader of the Decepticons again. When the Decepticons then return to Master, refugees from the planet are caught in a plasma bomb accident that fuses them to the arms of several Autobots and Decepticons, creating the Targetmasters, and in a final move, Scorponok attempts the destruction of Earth, only to be foiled, thanks in part to a traitorous Sixshot.

Adaptations

Not professionally released in the United States until July 5, 2011, The Headmasters was dubbed into English in Hong Kong by the dubbing company Omni Productions, for broadcast on the Malaysian TV channel, RTM1, and later the Singapore satellite station, StarTV, where it attained greater fame, leading it to often be referred to (albeit erroneously) as the "StarTV dub". The dub is, however, infamous for its poor quality, full of mistranslations and incorrect names (for example, Blaster becomes known as "Billy", Blurr is "Wally", Jazz is "Marshall", Hot Rod is "Rodimus" (pronounced "Roadimus"), the Matrix becomes the "Power Pack", Spike is "Sparkle", Soundblaster is "New Soundwave", Metroplex is called "Philip", and Fortress Maximus is occasionally called "Spaceship Bruce"), as well as stilted and even bizarre dialogue, such as "I'll send you express to hell!" and "Fortress Maximus has come himself". Also, Wheelie does not speak in rhyme (but seems to have a slight Scottish accent), the Dinobots speak normally (Grimlock does not say his famous "Me Grimlock" at all), Raiden is known as "Grimlock", and Blurr speaks abnormally slowly (though this at least can be chalked up to the difficulty of imitating John Moschitta's famous fast-talking style). Omni also dubbed the 1990s and 2000s Godzilla movies and Riki-Oh: The Story of Ricky, both of which are often ridiculed for extremely bad and at times cheesy dubbing. This dub has seen some releases in the United Kingdom, when it aired on AnimeCentral from September 13, 2007. In 2005, the full series with the original Japanese audio with subtitles and the English dub were released over 4-discs on DVD in Region 2. The full series was released on DVD in North America by Shout! Factory on July 5, 2011, without the English dub. In 2008, Madman Entertainment released the series on DVD in Australia in Region 4, PAL format.

A novel based on this anime titled  was written by Keisuke Fujikawa and released on August 25, 1987.

An eight-chapter manga adaptation of this anime was written by Masami Kaneda and illustrated by Ban Magami as part of their  series.

Theme songs
 Openings
 
 July 3, 1987 - March 25, 1988
 Lyricist: Keisuke Yamakawa / Composer: Takamune Negishi / Arranger: Katsunori Ishida / Singers: Hironobu Kageyama
 Episodes: 1–38

 Endings
 
 July 3, 1987 - March 25, 1988
 Lyricist: Keisuke Yamakawa / Composer: Takamune Negishi / Arranger: Katsunori Ishida / Singers: Hironobu Kageyama
 Episodes: 1–35, 38

 Insert Songs
 
 January 22, 1988, February 5, 1988, February 19, 1988, March 18, 1988
 Lyricist: Shinobu Urakawa / Composer: Takamune Negishi / Arranger: Katsunori Ishida / Singers: Hironobu Kageyama
 Episodes: 24, 26, 28, 32
 
 February 12, 1988, February 26, 1988
 Lyricist: Keisuke Yamakawa / Composer: Takamune Negishi / Arranger: Katsunori Ishida / Singers: Hironobu Kageyama
 Episodes: 27, 29
 
 Lyricist: Keisuke Fujikawa / Composer: Takamune Negishi / Arranger: Katsunori Ishida / Singers: Korogi '73, Mori no Ki Jido Gassho-dan
 Episodes: None
 "TRANSFORM!"
 Lyricist: Keisuke Yamakawa / Composer: Takeshi Ike / Arranger: Katsunori Ishida / Singers: Hironobu Kageyama
 Episodes: None
 
 Lyricist: Keisuke Fujikawa / Composer: Takamune Negishi / Arranger: Katsunori Ishida / Singers: Hironobu Kageyama
 Episodes: None
 
 Lyricist: Keisuke Yamakawa / Composer: Takamune Negishi / Arranger: Katsunori Ishida / Singers: Hironobu Kageyama
 Episodes: None
 
 Lyricist: Keisuke Fujikawa / Composer: Takamune Negishi / Arranger: Katsunori Ishida / Singers: Hironobu Kageyama
 Episodes: None
 
 Lyricist: Keisuke Yamakawa / Composer: Takeshi Ike / Arranger: Katsunori Ishida / Singers: Hironobu Kageyama, Ikuko Noguchi
 Episodes: None

Episodes

Video game

A video game based on the series was released by Takara in 1987 for the Family Computer Disk System (FDS). It can be played in either single-player or multiplayer, and it uses a Floppy disk.

In the game, players control one of the Autobot Headmasters through four planets – Earth, Cybertron, Master, and Chaar fighting the Decepticons. Unlike its predecessor, Mystery of Convoy, players cannot switch between robot and vehicle mode, as they are predetermined by level. Players also cannot choose which Autobot to play. Players must collect them throughout the game, as they will be flown in by helicopter and will replace that Autobot when they die. Due to Headmasters being for the FDS, the game came with a save game feature similar to those found in early Zelda and Metroid games.

References

External linksTransformers Japanese Collection: Headmasters'' at Shout! Factory
The Headmasters at the Transformers Wiki

1987 anime television series debuts
1987 Japanese novels
1987 Japanese television series debuts
1987 manga
1988 comics endings
1988 Japanese television series endings
Adventure anime and manga
Children's manga
Interactive television
Transformers: Headmasters
Transformers: Headmasters
Transformers: Headmasters
Transformers: Headmasters
Japanese television series based on American television series
Light novels
Manga series
Mecha anime and manga
Nippon TV original programming
Space opera anime and manga
Television series set in the 2010s
Television shows set in the United States
Toei Animation television
Headmasters
Transformers: Generation 1